During the 2004 United States elections, concerns were raised about various aspects of the voting process, including whether voting had been made accessible to all those entitled to vote, whether ineligible voters were registered, whether voters were registered multiple times, and whether the votes cast had been correctly counted. More controversial was the charge that these issues might have affected the reported outcome of the presidential election, in which the incumbent, Republican President George W. Bush, defeated the Democratic challenger, Senator John Kerry. Despite the existing controversies, Kerry conceded the election the following day on November 3.

There was generally less attention paid to the Senate and House elections and to various state races, but some of them were also questioned, especially the gubernatorial election in Washington, which was decided by less than 0.01% and involved several recounts and lawsuits. The final recount also reversed the outcome of this election.

Specific issues concerning the voting process

Voter registration
In the months leading up to the 2004 election, both parties made efforts to register new voters. In some cases, Republicans challenged or prepared to challenge the validity of many new registrations, citing instances of fictitious names such as Mary Poppins appearing on the voter rolls. Lawyers for the Kerry campaign accused the Republicans of using this as an excuse for vote suppression.

There were also complaints about the rejection of registrations by government agencies. College students encountered difficulties in registering where they attended school. Some officials rejected voter registration forms on grounds that were contested, such as a failure to use paper of a particular weight (in Ohio)or a failure to check a box on the form (Florida).

Aside from such official actions, there were disputes about other voter registration activities. In Nevada and Oregon, a company hired by the Republican National Committee solicited voter registration forms, but was accused of filing only the Republicans' forms and shredding those completed by Democrats. Individuals tenuously linked to nonprofit organizations, ACORN and the NAACP, were accused of submitting false voter registration forms and of carelessly or deliberately failing to submit some valid ones that they had received.

An analysis of Florida voter rolls in December 2004 alleged that over four registered voters had names that also appeared in a Social Security database of death claims, according to the Chicago Tribune. In response, the Brennan Center for Justice found reason to believe that the undisclosed methodology of the source article may have been inaccurate, and further noted that there was no allegation of anyone voting in someone else's name.

A New York Daily News article alleged 46,000 people were registered to vote in both New York City and Florida. A Cleveland Plain Dealer article identified 27,000 people possibly registered in both Ohio and Florida, with 400 possibly voting in both states consistently in the previous four years. The articles attempted to match voter rolls to each other, which probably did not produce accurate results due to similarity of names.

Purges of voter lists
State efforts to purge voter rolls have led to disputes, notably in Florida. Before the 2000 election, Florida officials purged approximately 100,000 registered voters on the grounds that they were convicted felons (and therefore ineligible to vote under Florida law) or dead. Many of those whose names were purged were "false positives" (not actually felons). (See Florida Central Voter File.) A post-election lawsuit brought by the NAACP, the People for the American Way Foundation, and other organizations resulted in a settlement in 2002 in which the state agreed to restore eligible voters to the rolls and take other steps to improve election procedures.

The issue returned to prominence in 2004 when Florida announced another planned purge, again based on a list of felons. The state government initially attempted to keep the list secret. When a court ordered its release, it was found to contain mostly Democrats and a disproportionate number of people from racial minorities. Faced with media documentation that the list included thousands of errors, the state abandoned the attempt to use it. Some of the voters improperly purged in 2000 had not been restored .

Voter suppression

Representative Dennis Kucinich (Democrat from Ohio) commented on allegations of voter suppression in Ohio during the 2004 election:

John Pappageorge, a Republican state legislator in Michigan, said in summer 2004, "If we do not suppress the Detroit vote, we're going to have a tough time in this election." Pappageorge later claimed he was taken out of context saying, "In the context that we were talking about, I said we've got to get the vote up in Oakland (County) and the vote down in Detroit. You get it down with a good message."

Court injunctions were placed by the Franklin County Common Pleas Court against MoveOn for verbally threatening and harassing individuals who identified themselves as Republican. On October 5, a Bush-Cheney campaign volunteer in Orlando had his arm broken when trying to stop union activists from storming the campaign office. The "storming" was part of a massive simultaneous campaign against 20 pro-Republican headquarters.

Practical impediments
In every election, some voters encounter practical impediments to voting, such as long lines at the polling place. In 2004, however, the issue received increased attention. In many places, some voters had to wait several hours to vote. Ohio voters, in particular, were plagued by this issue. A study conducted by the Democratic National Committee in the summer of 2005 found that long lines forced three percent of the state's registered voters to abstain.

Among the factors thought to be at work were: the general increase in voter turnout; a particular increase in first-time voters whose processing required more time; and confusion about the providing of provisional ballots, which many states had never used before.

Distribution of voting machines proved to be a problem in some districts. In Ohio, some precincts had too few machines, causing long waiting times, while others had many machines per registered voters. Officials cited a late rush of registrations after voting machines had already been allocated as one source of long lines.

Voting machines

In the 2000 election, especially in the disputed recounts in Florida, there were issues concerning the ambiguities and uncertainties that arose from punch-card ballots, such as the hanging chads (incompletely punched holes). In 2004, the punch-card ballots were still widely used in some states. For example, most Ohio voters used punch-card ballots, and more than 90,000 ballots cast in Ohio were treated as not including a vote for President; this "undervote" could arise because the voter chose not to cast a vote or because of a malfunction of the punch-card system.

For the country as a whole, the voting technology used in the 2004 election breaks down as follows:

Before 2004, the increasing use of electronic voting machines had raised several issues:
 Security. Without proper testing and certification, electronic voting machines could produce an incorrect report due to malfunction or deliberate manipulation.
 Recounts. Voting machine recounts should include auditing of hardware, software and the comparison of multiple vote records. Nevada was one of several states which insisted on electronic voting systems that create a paper trail.
 Partisan ties. Democrats noted the Republican or conservative ties of several leading executives in the companies providing the machines.

The state of California ordered that 15,000 of its Diebold voting machines not be used in the 2004 elections due to flaws that the company failed to disclose.

In September 2005, the Government Accountability Office released a report noting electronic voting systems hold promise for improving the election process while citing concerns about security and reliability raised by numerous groups, and detailing specific problems that have occurred.

Provisional and absentee ballots
Provisional ballots are for would-be voters who assert that they are registered but whose names cannot be found in the list available at the polling place. The voter completes a written ballot, which is placed in a sealed envelope. The ballot is opened and counted only if the voter is subsequently found to be registered.

In 2004, there was contention over the standards for determining whether to count provisional ballots. In Ohio, Secretary of State Ken Blackwell ruled that Ohio would not count provisional ballots, even those from properly registered voters, that were submitted at the wrong precinct. This ruling was ultimately upheld by the United States Court of Appeals for the 6th Circuit.

Absentee ballots were also an issue. There were reports of absentee ballots being mailed out too late for some voters to complete and return them in time. In some instances, officials argued that last-minute litigation over Ralph Nader's ballot status or other issues had prevented them from finalizing the absentee ballots as early as they wanted to. In Broward County, Florida, some 58,000 absentee ballots were delivered to the Postal Service to be mailed to voters, according to county election officials, but the Postal Service said it had never received them.

Exit polling
The 2004 election brought new attention to the issue of exit polls. Discrepancies existed between early exit poll information and the officially reported results. These discrepancies led some, including Tony Blair, Prime Minister of the United Kingdom, to conclude that Kerry won the election prematurely. Expert opinion was divided concerning what inferences should be drawn from the cited discrepancies.

Mitofsky International, the company responsible for exit polling for the National Election Pool (NEP) and its member news organizations, released a report detailing the 2004 election's exit polling. At issue were the early release of some poll information, issues regarding correcting exit poll data using actual voter totals, and differences between exit polls and official results.

The NEP report stated that "the size of the average exit poll error ... was higher in 2004 than in previous years for which we have data" and that exit polling estimates overstated Kerry's share of the vote in 26 states by more than one standard error and overestimated Bush's share in four states by more than one standard error. It concluded that these discrepancies between the exit polls and the official results were "most likely due to Kerry voters participating in the exit polls at a higher rate than Bush voters". The NEP report further stated that "Exit polls do not support the allegations of fraud due to rigging of voting equipment. Our analysis of the difference between the vote count and the exit poll at each polling location in our sample has found no systematic differences for precincts using touch screen and optical scan voting equipment."

A study performed by the Caltech / MIT Voting Technology Project concluded that "there is no evidence, based on exit polls, that electronic voting machines were used to steal the 2004 election for President Bush." This study was criticized for using data that had been corrected to match the official count, and thus "essentially analyzing rounding error". On December 5, 2004 Charles Stewart III of MIT released a revised report which, he said, used pre-corrected data. Two days later, however, Warren Mitofsky, who had overseen the exit polling, stated that the pre-corrected data were proprietary and would not be released.

One paper (and a follow-up book) concluded that discrepancies in the exit polls were evidence that the election results were off, though others alleged this paper was unscientific.

Following the 2004 election, researchers looked at ways in which polling methodologies might be flawed and explored ways to improve polling in the future.

Racial discrimination
Some of the issues described above have created problems for voters generally. Others, however, by accident or (it is charged) by design, have disproportionately affected racial minorities. For example, the U.S. Commission on Civil Rights determined that, in Florida in 2000, 54 percent of the ballots discarded as "spoiled" were cast by African Americans, who were only 11 percent of the voters. Another paper studied the residual vote rates of the election technology used and the distribution of those technologies among race and found that the percentage of spoiled votes did not disproportionally affect any particular race.

Recounts

Ralph Nader requested a recount of 11 wards in New Hampshire where vote totals for Bush were 5–15% higher than predicted by exit polls. The Nader campaign reports:

In Ohio, two minor-party presidential candidates, Michael Badnarik (Libertarian Party) and David Cobb (Green Party) cooperated in requesting a recount.

According to Ohio recount rules, 3% of a county's votes are tallied by hand, and typically one or more whole precincts are selected and combined to get the 3% sample. The 3% must be randomly selected, and all hand counts are to be performed in public (with observers). After the hand count, the sample is fed into the tabulator. If there is no discrepancy, the remaining ballots can be counted by the machine. Otherwise, a hand recount must be done for the whole county.

The Cobb campaign claimed that the precincts were not randomly selected and the ballots were pre-sorted. They suggested that this indicates that precincts were selected that would match the machine count, in order to prevent a county-wide hand count, i.e. that it was "staged". Two poll workers were convicted of preselecting ballots for the recounts.

Around the country there were also recounts of races for state and local office. Most of them reflected simply the closeness of the official tally, but some also raised issues of election irregularities. These included the elections for:
 Governor of Washington, between Dino Rossi and Christine Gregoire. Issues raised included the mailing of absentee ballots, the counting of provisional and absentee ballots, correction of improper marks on optically scanned ballots, and alleged tampering with electronic voting machines. The first tally and the first recount gave the election to Republican Dino Rossi. However, after two statewide recounts, Gregoire, the Democrat, had a narrow lead of 129 votes out of 2.8 million cast. A Republican lawsuit seeking to overturn the result and force a re-vote was rejected by the court, after which Rossi conceded the election. See Washington gubernatorial election, 2004.
 North Carolina Commissioner of Agriculture, between Britt Cobb and Steve Troxler. The number of votes lost due to a voting machine malfunction in Carteret County (over 4,000) exceed the reported margin of about 2,000. A new election was called for by state election supervisors, but was mooted when Cobb conceded.
 Governor of Puerto Rico, between Aníbal Acevedo Vilá and Pedro Rosselló. Aníbal Acevedo-Vilá was declared the winner after several months of disputes. The two candidates were separated by just under 4,000 votes.

Objection to certification of Ohio's electoral votes
On January 6, 2005, Senator Barbara Boxer of California joined Representative Stephanie Tubbs Jones of Ohio in filing a congressional objection to the certification of Ohio's Electoral College votes due to alleged irregularities including disqualification of provisional ballots, alleged misallocation of voting machines, and disproportionally long waits in poor and predominantly African-American communities. The Senate voted the objection down 1–74; the House voted the objection down 31–267. It was only the second congressional objection to an entire state's electoral delegation in U.S. history; the first instance was in 1877, when all the electors from Florida, Louisiana, and South Carolina, and one from Oregon—twenty in all—were challenged. (An objection to one faithless elector was filed in 1969.)

References

External links
 Steve Rosenthal, Washington Post "Okay, We Lost Ohio. The Question Is, Why?" December 5, 2004
 William Raspberry, Washington Post Comments on problems with the 2004 election January 10, 2005
 Manuel Roig-Franzia and Dan Keating, Washington Post "Latest Conspiracy Theory – Kerry Won – Hits the Ether" November 11, 2004
 Mark Hertsgaard, Mother Jones, "Recounting Ohio" November 2005
 Robert F. Kennedy, Jr., Rolling Stone, "Was the 2004 Election Stolen?" June 1, 2006
 Farhad Manjoo, Salon, Was the 2004 Election Stolen? No. – Critique of Robert F. Kennedy Jr.'s Rolling Stone Article June 3, 2006
 Final Tallies Minus Exit Polls=A Statistical Mystery!, John Allen Paulos. November 24, 2004
 Mark Crispin Miller, Harper's None Dare Call it Stolen August 2005

 
2004 United States presidential election
Voter suppression